Jonathan Mason may refer to:

Jonathan Mason (politician), American politician, 1756–1831
Jonathan Mason (actor), English actor

See also
John Mason (disambiguation)